Stadion Prljanije is a football stadium in Andrijevica, Montenegro. Situated in the valley of Lim river, it is used for football matches. It is the home ground of FK Komovi.

History
In the early history, FK Komovi played their home games in Zlorječica stadium. In 1975, following the team's progress in the Fourth League competition, a new stadium was built at location Prljanije. The stadium was renovated at 2018, when the new stand is built, with a capacity of 650 seats.

Pitch and conditions
The pitch measures 110 x 70 meters. Stadium meets criteria only for Montenegrin Third League games, not for highest-rank competitions.

See also
FK Komovi
Andrijevica

References

External links
 Stadium information

Football venues in Montenegro
Football in Montenegro
Andrijevica Municipality